The Division Flute is a collection of variations over ground basses and their melodies. The Division Flute was first published in 1706/1708 by John Walsh, senior and is based on The Division Violin by John Playford. Most of the grounds are anonymous folk songs taken from different styles like the French chaconne or the Italian Ostinato.

Terminology

Division 

The word division basically means variation and describes the ornamentation of the melody. In the 17th century, "divisions" became bravura pieces for violinists in England. The virtuosos simply took a common folk song and improvised about it according to their abilities.

Ground bass 

A ground bass is a type of ostinato, which is a melodic figure repeated over and over again in the same voice. The ground bass specifically is a melodic line or harmonic pattern repeated in the bass voice. The most famous example of this is Pachelbel's Canon.

History 
In the 17th century, music became more common for amateurs and non-professional musicians. With the elevation of music in people's everyday lives, the recorder, as an attractive, simple instrument to learn, became one of the most popular instruments. The Division Violin is a collection of the most famous of the divisions, played by the virtuosic violin players in England. John Playford published it in 1684. After the role of the recorder grew, the publisher John Walsh, senior, transcribed (or had someone else transcribe) some of the pieces for recorder and added his own selection of other divisions and published them in 1706/1708.

John Walsh 

John Walsh, senior, was one of the most important music publishers and printers of his day. Born around 1665 in London he was the musical instrument-maker-in-ordinary for the king since 1692. He developed many new printing techniques and printed music for composers like Arcangelo Corelli and George Frideric Handel.

Book 1

Book 2

References 

Compositions for recorder
Compositions for flute